The following are the football (soccer) events of the year 1929 throughout the world.

Events
Formation of the Football Association of Zambia in 1929.

Winners club national championship 
 Argentina: Club de Gimnasia y Esgrima La Plata
 Austria: Rapid Wien
 Belgium: Royal Antwerp
 Czechoslovakia: Slavia Prague
 Denmark: B93
 England: Sheffield Wednesday
 France: Olympique Marseille
 Germany: SpVgg Fürth
 Greece: not held due to financial reasons
 Hungary: MTK Hungaria
 Iceland: KR
 Ireland: Shelbourne
 Italy: Bologna
 Luxembourg: Spora Luxembourg
 Netherlands: PSV Eindhoven
 Paraguay: Olimpia Asunción
 Poland: Warta Poznan
 Romania: Venus București
 Scotland:
Division One: Rangers
Scottish Cup: Kilmarnock
 Spain: F.C. Barcelona
 Sweden: Hälsingborgs IF (not awarded) 
 Switzerland: Young Boys

International tournaments
 1929 British Home Championship (October 22, 1928 – April 13, 1929)

 Baltic Cup 1929 in Latvia (August 14–16, 1929)

 1929-32 Nordic Football Championship (June 14, 1929 – September 25, 1932) 1929: (June 14 - October 13, 1929)
 (1929)
 (1929-1932)

 South American Championship 1929 in Argentina (November 1, 1929 – November 17, 1929)

Births
 January 5: Aulis Rytkönen, Finnish international footballer (died 2014)
 January 7: Manfred Kaiser, East German international footballer (died 2017)
 February 3: Néstor Carballo, Uruguayan international footballer (died 1981)
 February 3: Büyük Jeddikar, Iranian international footballer (died 2013)
 February 6: Ramón Martínez Pérez, Spanish footballer (died 2017)
 February 28: Yevgeny Goryansky, Russian football striker and coach (died 1999) 
 April 17: Karl-Erik Palmér, Swedish international footballer (died 2015)
 April 18 – Ion Voinescu, Romanian footballer (died 2018)
 April 19: Jiří Hledík, Czech international footballer (died 2015)
 May 12: Don Gibson, English club footballer 
 May 18: Herbert Schoen, East German international footballer (died 2014)
 June 23: Bart Carlier, Dutch football player (died 2017)
 July 7: Colin Walker, English footballer (died 2017)
 July 13: Luciano Panetti, Italian footballer (died 2016)
 July 18: 
Enore Boscolo, Italian footballer 
Roy Killin, Canadian footballer (Manchester United)
 July 21: José Santamaría, Spanish-Uruguayan international footballer
 October 22: Lev Yashin, Soviet international footballer (died 1990)
 November 12: Ríkharður Jónsson, Icelandic international footballer (died 2017)
 November 25: Marcel De Corte, Belgian footballer (died 2017)
 November 30: Doğan Babacan, Turkish football referee (died 2018)
 December 9: Luis Cid, Spanish football coach, manager (died 2018)
 December 17: Eliseo Prado, Argentine international footballer (died 2016)

Deaths

References 

 
Association football by year